The 49th United States Colored Infantry, first established as the 11th Louisiana Infantry (African descent) was an infantry regiment in the Union Army during the American Civil War.

Vicksburg Campaign
The unit was organized at Milliken's Bend, Louisiana on May 23 of 1863 and fought in the Battle of Milliken's Bend on June 7. Along with the Mississippi 1st and 3rd and the Louisiana 8th, 9th, 10th and 12th Regiment Infantry (African Descent) they were attached to the African Brigade, District of Northeast Louisiana, until July 1863. They were posted at Goodrich's Landing until January 1864 and at Vicksburg, Mississippi between January and March 1864. An expedition to Waterproof, Louisiana was undertaken from January to February 1864.

49th United States Colored Regiment Infantry
The designation of the regiment was changed to the 49th Regiment Infantry, U.S. Colored Troops on March 11, 1864. The regiment served on garrison duty at Vicksburg, Mississippi and mustered out March 27, 1866.

See also

List of Louisiana Union Civil War units

References 

Infantry, 011
Louisiana Infantry, 011
Military units and formations established in 1863
1863 establishments in Louisiana
Military units and formations disestablished in 1866